Tetramethyl acetyloctahydronaphthalenes  (International Nomenclature for Cosmetic Ingredients (INCI) name) is a synthetic ketone fragrance also known as OTNE  (octahydrotetramethyl acetophenone) and by other commercial trade names such as: Iso E Super, Iso Gamma Super, Anthamber, Amber Fleur, Boisvelone, Iso Ambois, Amberlan, Iso Velvetone, Orbitone, Amberonne. It is a synthetic woody odorant and is used as a fragrance ingredient in perfumes, laundry products and cosmetics.

Odour 
OTNE has a woody, slightly ambergris odour, reminiscent of clean human skin. Its odour is long-lasting on skin and fabric.

Uses 
Iso E Super is a very common perfume ingredient, providing a sandalwood-like and cedarwood-like fragrance, in soap, shampoo, perfumes, detergents, fabric fresheners, antiperspirants or deodorants, and air fresheners. It is also used as a tobacco flavoring (at 200–2000 ppm), as a plasticizer and as a precursor for the delivery of organoleptic and antimicrobial compounds.

Production 
Iso E Super is produced commercially by Diels–Alder reaction of myrcene with 3-methyl-3-penten-2-one in the presence of aluminium chloride to give a monocyclic intermediate that is cyclized in the presence of 85% phosphoric acid.

Carrying out the initial Diels–Alder reaction using a Lewis acid catalyst such as aluminum chloride appears to ensure that the acetyl group is at position 2 of the resulting cyclohexene adduct, which distinguished Iso E Super from other (previously patented) fragrances based on tetramethylacetyloctaline. The second cyclization reaction yields a mixture of diastereomers with the general structure depicted above, the predominant ones being (2R,3R) and (2S,3S).

Chemical Summary 

OTNE is the abbreviation for the fragrance material with Chemical Abstract Service (CAS) numbers 68155-66-8, 54464-57-2 and 68155-67-9 and EC List number 915-730-3. It is a multi-constituent isomer mixture containing:

1-(1,2,3,4,5,6,7,8-octahydro-2,3,8,8-tetramethyl-2-naphthyl)ethan-1-one (CAS 54464-57-2)
1-(1,2,3,5,6,7,8,8a-octahydro-2,3,8,8-tetramethyl-2-naphthyl)ethan-1-one (CAS 68155-66-8)
1-(1,2,3,4,6,7,8,8a-octahydro-2,3,8,8-tetramethyl-2-naphthyl)ethan-1-one (CAS 68155-67-9)

All isomers conform to the chemical formula C16H26O and have a molecular weight of 234.4 g/mol.

Physical-chemical properties 

OTNE is a clear yellow liquid at 20 °C. Its melting point is below −20 °C at atmospheric pressure, and its boiling point is determined to be at around 290 °C (modified OECD 103 method). All physicochemical data have been obtained from the OTNE REACH registration dossier.

Safety 
Iso E Super may cause allergic reactions detectable by patch tests in humans and chronic exposure to Iso E Super from perfumes may result in permanent hypersensitivity. In a study with female mice, Iso E Super was positive in the local lymph node assay (LLNA) and irritancy assay (IRR), but negative in the mouse ear swelling test (MEST).

No data were available regarding chemical disposition, metabolism, or toxicokinetics; acute, short-term, subchronic, or chronic toxicity; synergistic or antagonistic activity; reproductive or teratological effects; carcinogenicity; genotoxicity; or immunotoxicity.

The International Fragrance Association (IFRA) has published safe use levels for Iso E Super in consumer products.

OTNE is not toxic and not a CMR substance.

OTNE is classified as a skin irritant (R38 EU DSD, H315 EU CLP) and is positive in the Local Lymph Node Assay (LLNA – OECD 429) and therefore classified as a skin sensitiser (R43 EU DSD, H317 EU CLP), though OTNE lacks any structural alerts for sensitisation in in silico prediction models (DEREK) and is not identified as an allergen in in vivo Human Repeated Patch Tests.

Several health related studies have been conducted on OTNE, and based on these studies, OTNE has been determined to be safe under the current conditions of use.

Given the sensitization classification of OTNE, and its use in fragrances, the International Fragrance Association (IFRA) has published safe use levels for OTNE in consumer products, which have been in effect since August 2009.

Environmental data 
OTNE is classified as H410 Very toxic to aquatic life with long-lasting effects (EU-CLP) or R51/53 Toxic to aquatic organisms, may cause long-term adverse effects in the aquatic environment (EU DSD).
The biodegradation of OTNE in fresh water (T1/2) is at most 40 days, and at most 120 days in sediment (OECD 314 test), though the biodegradation within the 28day window was around 11% (OECD 301-C).  Given the outcome of the OECD 314 test OTNE does not meet the criteria for “Persistent” (P) or “very Persistent” (vP).
The measured Bio Concentration Factor (BCF) is 391 L/kg, which is well below the EU limit of 2000 and US limit of 1000 for Bioaccumulation (B) classification. The LogKow for OTNE has been measured to be 5.65.

OTNE is therefore not classified as a PBT or vPvB substance  for the EU or any other global criteria.

OTNE has been detected in surface water at levels of 29–180 ng/L, These values are well below the Predicted No Effect Concentration (PNEC) and as a result the overall  environmental risk ratio (also referred to as RCR or PEC/PNECS) is determined to be below 1.

Regulatory status 
OTNE is registered on all major chemical inventories (US, Japan, China, Korea, Philippines, and Australia) and has been EU REACH registered in 2010.
In 2014 the US National Toxicology Program (NTP) conducted a 13-week repeat dose toxicity study and found no adverse effects.

OTNE has been recommended for inclusion in an update for the EU Fragrance Allergens labelling for cosmetic products based on a small number of positive reactions in dermatological clinics of around 0.2% to 1.7% of patients tested in three studies

If the proposed SCCS Opinion is taken forward into legislation then OTNE will be labelled on cosmetic products in the EU, several years after publication of a new legislation.

List of products containing Iso E Super 
 The fragrance Molecule 01 (Escentric Molecules, 2005) is a specific isomer of Iso E Super, by the company IFF.  Its partner fragrance Escentric 01 contains Iso E Super but also ambroxan, pink pepper, green lime with balsamic notes like benzoin mastic and incense.
 The fragrance Eternity by Calvin Klein (1988) contained 11.7% Iso E Super in the fragrance portion of the formula.
 The fragrance Scent of a Dream by Charlotte Tilbury contains Iso E Super.
 The fragrance No.1 Invisible by Perfume Extract contains Iso E Super.

History 
OTNE was patented in 1975 as an invention of International Flavors and Fragrances.

References 

Perfume ingredients
Flavors
Ketones
Cosmetics chemicals